M-94 is a state trunkline in the Upper Peninsula of the US state of Michigan. The highway is part of the Lake Superior Circle Tour during a concurrency with M-28. M-94 crosses the Siphon Bridge in Manistique, unique for the fact that the bridge roadway is below water level.

M-94 has been realigned several times. It has had its own roadway between the M-28 junctions in Munising and Shingleton. Other changes have flip-flopped M-94 with M-28 between Harvey and Munising and extended it across the former K.I. Sawyer Air Force Base.

Route description

M-94 begins at an intersection with M-553 and crosses the former K. I. Sawyer AFB. Then it overlaps US 41 for a little over a mile near Skandia. East of Skandia, M-94 runs through forest lands and serves the communities of Sundell and Rumely before entering Eben Junction. There M-94 intersects the southern section of H-01. Further east is Chatham where there are junctions with the northern section of H-01 and M-67. M-94 turns southerly briefly  before returning to an east–west direction to head to the community of Forest Lake and ultimately Munising. There M-94 joins  a concurrency with M-28 and the Lake Superior Circle Tour from Munising to Shingleton. Until the turn at Shingleton, the route is more decidedly east–west than north–south. Between Shingleton and Manistique, M-94 is more north–south.

South of Shingleton, M-94 runs through forest lands as a part of the Great Manistique Swamp. Along the way are national forest campgrounds located near Steuben. South of Crooked Lake, M-94 curves to the east before turning almost due south to the Manistique area. In Manistique, M-94 enters town on North 5th St before turning to follow Deer Street and River Street. On River Street, the trunkline uses the Siphon Bridge to cross the Manistique River and then uses Elk and Maple streets before terminating at US 2 at Lakeshore Drive.

Siphon Bridge
In Manistique, M-94 crosses the Manistique River on the "Siphon Bridge". Built as a part of a raceway flume on the river, the water level actually used to be higher than the road surface. This produced a siphon effect, giving the bridge its nickname. The Manistique Pulp and Paper Company was organized in 1916 and needed a dam on the Manistique River to supply their mill. This dam would have needed to flood a large section of the city. The shallow river banks meant difficulties in any bridge construction. Instead of expensive dikes, a concrete tank was built lengthwise in the river bed. The sides of this tank provided man-made banks higher than the natural banks. The Michigan Works Progress Administration described the bridge as having, "concrete bulkheads, formed by the side spans of the bridge, [that]  allow the mill to maintain the water level several feet above the roadbed." The bridge acted as a siphon because the water level was above the roadway, and the structure has been featured in Ripley's Believe It or Not!

History

The December 1927 Michigan State Highway Department Official Highway Service Map shows M-94 routed from Au Train west to Munising and further along its current routing to Manistique. In 1928 or 1929, M-94 was rerouted to run along Munising-Van Meer-Shingleton Road (now H-58 and H-15) and southerly to Shingleton. This routing was abandoned on November 7, 1963. It was later extended westward to Harvey in 1939. In 1941, the portion of M-94 west from Munising to Harvey was made a part of M-28, and M-94 was extended along its current routing from Munising to US 41. M-94 was extended for the last time in 1998 over US 41 and through the old K. I. Sawyer Air Force Base to end at a newly designated M-553. In October 2016, heavy rainfall cause the culverts directing the Chocolay River under M-94 in West Branch Township to fail.

Major intersections

See also

References

External links

M-94 at Michigan Highways
Siphon Bridge at MDOT

094
Lake Superior Circle Tour
Transportation in Marquette County, Michigan
Transportation in Alger County, Michigan
Transportation in Schoolcraft County, Michigan